Vladimir Dmitrievich Nakhabtsev (16 July 1938, Korolyov, Moscow Oblast —  10 March 2002, Moscow) was a Soviet cinematographer and actor, renowned for his work with Eldar Ryazanov and Mark Zakharov.

Selected filmography
 Give Me a Book of Complaints (1965); directed by Eldar Ryazanov
 Beware of the Car (1966); directed by Eldar Ryazanov
 Moscow, My Love (1974); directed by Alexander Mitta
 The Irony of Fate (1975); directed by Eldar Ryazanov
 Office Romance (1977); directed by Eldar Ryazanov
 The Garage (1979); directed by Eldar Ryazanov
 The Very Same Munchhausen (1979); directed by Mark Zakharov
 Say a Word for the Poor Hussar (1981); directed by Eldar Ryazanov
 Formula of Love (1984); directed by Mark Zakharov
 To Kill a Dragon (1988); directed by Mark Zakharov
 A Little Doll (1988); directed by Isaakas Fridbergas

References

External links
 

1938 births
2002 deaths
Soviet cinematographers
Gerasimov Institute of Cinematography alumni
Burials in Troyekurovskoye Cemetery
People's Artists of the RSFSR
Recipients of the Vasilyev Brothers State Prize of the RSFSR
Recipients of the USSR State Prize
Communist Party of the Soviet Union members